Christina M. Slade (born 1953) is an Australian academic and author who was Vice-Chancellor of Bath Spa University, England, from 2012 to 2017.

Biography
Slade is an Emeritus Professor of Bath Spa University, having held the position of Vice-Chancellor from January 2012 to August 2017. During her time in office she was responsible for the University's strategic plan, financial management, academic quality and the external profile. One of her first projects, which she inherited, was the re-development of the university's Newton Park campus at a cost of £40 million. She was also responsible for driving a successful international student recruitment agenda.

Slade has held a number of senior academic roles including Dean of the Schools of Arts and of Social Sciences, and Shadow Deputy Vice-Chancellor at City University, London (2009–12). She was Dean of Humanities at Macquarie University (2003–9) and Professor of Media Theory at the University of Utrecht, in which capacity she led a €1.25 million seven-nation EU-funded project entitled 'Media and Citizenship: transnational television cultures reshaping political identities in the EU.' At the University of Canberra (2001–3), Slade was Head of School for Creative Communication and developed a suite of modularised online Masters in New Media.

Educated at the Australian National University, she achieved a BA and a PhD in Philosophy (1982). Trained as a philosopher of logic and language, her research has focused on issues of the media since 1990. Her monograph, 'The Real Thing: doing philosophy with media' (2002) examines the role of reason in the media, while 'From Migrant to Citizen: testing language, testing culture', (2010) jointly edited with Martina Möllering, looks at linguistic, legal and philosophical aspects of citizenship testing. Slade has received a total of $5 million in external grants.

Slade is a member of several national and international committees, including University of Gibraltar Academic Board, Association of Commonwealth Universities, Institute of Directors, Royal Society of Art,s and the European Association of International Education. She was also Chair of the Philosophy of Communication Division for the International Communication Association (2004–7). Involved in community organisations, Slade is an Honorary Life Patron for the Society of Philosophy for the Young.

She is married to a former Australian ambassador and has two children.

Awards and nominations 
 Fondación Carolina award from Spanish Government (2005)
 Rector's Award, Universidad Ibero Americana (1998)
 Harkness Fellowship, New York University (1996–7)
 Commonwealth Scholarship and Fellowship Plan, Somerville College, Oxford (1976–7)
 National Undergraduate Scholarship, Australian National University (1972–74)

Australian directorships, 2000–2008
 Member, Council for Humanities Arts and Social Sciences (CHASS)
 Member of Board, Australian Services Round table: services industry lobby group
 Chair of Board, Macquarie Ancient History Museum
 Chair of Board, Australian Centre for Numismatics
 Chair of Board, Macquarie PEN Anthology of Australian Literature
 Member of Board, Centre for Middle East Studies
 Deputy Chair of Board, Innovative Research University European Union Centre
 Director, Australian National Centre for Latin American Studies

Bibliography

Monographs, joint and edited books 
 eds. Slade, C & Möllering, M. (2010) From Migrant to Citizen: testing language, testing culture, Palgrave Macmillan, London.
 Slade, C (2008) A Tale of Two Women Adelaide, South Australia: Wakefield.
 Slade, C. (2002) The Real Thing: Doing Philosophy with the Media. Boston: Peter Lang.
 Lewis, G. and Slade, C. (1994) Critical Communication. Sydney: Prentice Hall.
 Slade, C. ed. (1993) Media Images of Australia/Asia: Cross Cultural Reflections. Proceedings of Conference held at the University of Canberra, November 1992. Canberra: CCIR.
 Slade, C. (1986) 'Falsification and the Theory of Meaning', Logic Series, vol. 26:
 Slade, C. ed. (1983) A Traveller’s Guide to Pakistan. Islamabad: Asian Study Group.
 Slade, C. (1982) 'Anti-realism: the manifestation of semantic knowledge'. PhD thesis, ANU.

References

Vice-Chancellors of Bath Spa University
Academics of Bath Spa University
1953 births
Living people
People associated with City, University of London
Academic staff of Macquarie University
Australian National University alumni
University of New England (Australia) alumni
Place of birth missing (living people)
Australian women philosophers
Australian logicians
Philosophers of language
20th-century Australian philosophers
21st-century Australian philosophers
Women heads of universities and colleges